Scaramelli is an Italian surname. Notable people with the surname include:

Álvaro Scaramelli, Chilean singer
Franco Scaramelli (born 1911), Italian footballer
Giovanni Battista Scaramelli (1687–1752), Italian Jesuit, ethicist and writer
Giovanni Carlo Scaramelli (1550-1608), Venetian diplomat

Italian-language surnames